In Greek mythology, Andromachus (Ancient Greek: Ἀνδρόμαχον means "fighting with men") was a Cretan warrior who was killed by Aeneas during the Trojan War. He was from Cnossus.

Note

References 

 Quintus Smyrnaeus, The Fall of Troy translated by Way. A. S. Loeb Classical Library Volume 19. London: William Heinemann, 1913. Online version at theio.com
Quintus Smyrnaeus, The Fall of Troy. Arthur S. Way. London: William Heinemann; New York: G.P. Putnam's Sons. 1913. Greek text available at the Perseus Digital Library.

Knossos
Achaeans (Homer)
People of the Trojan War
Cretan characters in Greek mythology